is the main protagonist of Rifujin na Magonote's novel series Mushoku Tensei. An unnamed 34-year-old Japanese NEET is kicked out by his siblings following his parents' death and his absence in their parent's funeral. Upon some self-introspection, he had concluded that his life was ultimately pointless, but still intercepts a speeding truck heading towards a group of teenagers in an attempt to do something meaningful for once in his life and manages to pull one of them out of harm's way before dying. Awakening as a newborn baby, he realizes that he's been reincarnated in a world of sword and sorcery and resolves to live his second life to the fullest as Rudeus Greyrat. Due to inherited affinity and early training, in addition to his mother's influence, Rudeus becomes highly skilled at magic, and sets out to enjoy life and overcome his past.

In Japanese, the character is voiced by Tomokazu Sugita in his inner mind and former self, while Yumi Uchiyama voices the reborn Rudeus. Ben Phillips takes Sugita's work in the English dub, while Madeleine Morris does the young Rudeus.

Critical response to Rudeus has been mixed, with polarizing response due to his excessively perverted or even pedophilic nature with regards to his early interactions with young female characters, while others have enjoyed his growth into a more mature man later on in the show.

Creation

Rifujin na Magonote commented that he created Rudeus while being aware of how controversial he would be. He intended Rudeus' actions to be more meaningful in the process. He had no issue with criticizing Rudeus at the beginning stage, and left it to the audience to judge him. Magonote wanted the audience to pay attention to a specific side of his character and be able to relate to him. The author said it was a little strange for the hero who had ruined his entire life because of his failure at school in his previous life to call the school "a place where he can fail". Rifujin na Magonote had thought that he should give such impression. However, he also wanted to depict a student who fails at school trying to have another chance at life through this series. Earlier, he said that he felt a big response in episodes 6 to 7 of the web version of the novels, but that was just when Roxy took Rudeus out. Thanks to her, Rudeus overcomes the trauma. Such a story gave a warm impression to his readers, and made him, think, "Let's grow [the character] in this direction."

Originally, the story arc where Rudeus reunites with Aisha was supposed to be completely different from the published work. The original plan was not to make the trip so long, because Rudeus' plot was planned to be more stuffed, in the form of having an affair with Sylphy while being tied to Eris. In the final scenario, Rudy is not cheating with anyone, so his relationships can be perceived as a little forcible, but the author decided to get him misunderstood. Seven Seas made localization changes in their translations of the light novels, such as toning down Rudeus' perverted behavior and removing references to rape. They later decided to "re-evaluate" their localization decisions.

Anime director Manabu Okamoto said the "character has an opposing personality: a vulgar side that is incredibly difficult to sympathize with, as well as a more normal and conventional side that can be sympathized with. Those negative traits are a part of his identity, so he can't be rid of them", but took consideration to in avoiding discomfort with the audience. The staff felt it was extremely difficult to portray the gradual growth of a Rudeus going through significant body changes. In contrast to traditional time-skips to change Rudeus' design, the team decided to make the protagonist change little by little. The director left it up to the viewers to decide whether they did that well or not.

Casting
In the first Mushoku Tensei audio drama, Rudeus was voiced by Hiro Shimono. The actor enjoyed the work despite being unfamiliar with the novels. He still expressed difficulties in delivering certain lines where the character yells. Rudeus' father Paul was voiced by Eiji Takemoto who wanted to connect with his "son" which led him to connect with Shimono during recording. Shimono stated that he felt the audio drama to be quite dark, despite his beliefs of the original novel being more comical.

The reason the anime staff cast Tomokazu Sugita as the man in Rudy's previous life was because when the director read the original story, he thought it was "impossible for him [Rudeus] to be [portrayed by] anyone else". It also served as an homage to his (Sugita) role in a beloved anime that once aired in the past, and that was the starting point for the casting. After Rudeus reincarnates, he lives in his new world by generally acting with a mask on. His voice actor Yumi Uchiyama was noted to be "very skilled person", to the point "she nails that nuance". Upon first seeing the character, Sugita said he could not blame Rudeus for his actions based on how much bullied he was in his previous one. As a result, he is not sure how he would act in the story.

In the scene where Rudeus and Paul quarrel in episode 3, Uchiyama was able to know that there was a conflict from the perspective of the parents, but it is because the backbone and human drama of each of those characters are drawn very carefully. She felt that each and every character has a reality and is loved by everyone. From the standpoint of Rudeus, she was very encouraged when Eris said, "Rudeus is amazing!" thanks to how both characters have been interacting. Regarding Rudeus' mind, she says that she wants to be able to trace the character of Sugita, who played the role of the man from his [Rudeus's] previous life, but she also plays her own character. So as an actor, she was also experiencing a feeling that she cannot easily experience in other works. Uchiyama relates to Rudeus' second chance at life because she once quit her job but ended up taking it again, which helped her to become a more skilled worker. In December 2021, Uchiyama posted an update on Twitter that she would leaving the series after the next episode and was glad with her work and support. However, on December 10, 2022, it was announced that the voice actress will continue to play the main character Rudeus, into the 2nd season as well.

In the English dub of the series, the character is voiced by Ben Phillips as his former self and Madeleine Morris in his reborn persona. In November 2021, Morris claimed she grew fond of Rudeus due to all the hidden depths he has, which leaves his traumatic past as a mystery.

Appearances
Rudeus was born with brown hair and green eyes, thus resembling his father however, his face is softer with his jawline and nose resembling his mother. However, he later has the Demon Empress of the Demon World Kishirika Kishirisu switch out one of his original eyes for a demon eye "the eye of foresight" with a slightly different color from his natural eyes, causing him to be heterochromatic. Like his father, Paul, Rudeus also has a mole underneath his left eye. He eventually grows up to be a tall, well-built, and handsome man if not for a creepy smile that is said to be terrifying to the extent that people run away from him for fear of their lives when he smiles at them.

Reception
The initial response to Rudeus was generally negative, with Anime Feminist calling out his lust for women with the mention of lolicon in the novel, making him come across as disgusting. His first interactions with Roxy were also called out for how Rudeus takes advantage of his young age to accidentally spy on her while suggesting that she could be his future wife due to her antisocial personality. Anime News Network found Rudeus hard to sympathize, as in early chapters he barely develops connections, to the point he always refers to his parents by their names. However, the way Rudeus interacts with Roxy during his training as a mage was noted to benefit him, as thanks to her, he manages to mature and deal with his new life on a more positive note. Comic Book Resources saw the focus on Rudeus' emotions as what marks the series a major departure from other isekai storylines.

HITC found the anime properly followed the novel's narrative, most importantly Rudeus' coming-of-age story, which appealed to the audience. He was still present in anime popularity polls by Anime Trending from 2021, while Comic Book Resources listed him as one of the strongest isekai mages. The character has also received user criticism in China for containing perceived misogynistic comments and content. The series includes sexually-charged plot elements, like the main character stealing used underwear or using his mental powers to give an underage relative an orgasm at a funeral. Real Sound was concerned about how the narrative portrays Rudeus' previous life, as it appears to focus highly on retired school students and issues they had at school, comparing it to the famous isekai Re:Zero − Starting Life in Another World. Nevertheless, they noted the fact that Rudeus dedicates his new life to focus on surpassing his flaws, turned him into a more sympathetic main character.

Despite the several negative comments about Rudeus, his character progression led to praise. IGN praised the characterization of Rudeus for reincarnating in a life where he has to deal with the traumas of his previous life which were seen as harsh, accomplishing multiple goals in the process. In a general overview, Roxy's training of Rudeus was noted to have generated a major impact within light novels as a result of how much Rudeus matures accidentally when his mentor helps him deal with his fears of leaving his house, something that tormented him in his past life. The writer from Anime News Network described Rudeus as "a mean-spirited caricature of a pedophilic otaku" that contrast his growth in the narrative. In later story arcs from the series, Anime News Network acclaimed Rudeus' dilemma when dealing with his father on an antagonistic side on their a brief fight, Rudeus comes to sympathize with Paul, seeing his past sins on his own father and rather than attacking him again, he makes the peace he regretted not making in his past life. Although Rudeus sinks into depression when Eris leaves him, Anime News Network praised how Rudeus overcomes his situation on his own and leaves on a journey on his own which, according to the reviewer, helps to further develop himself as he continues facing his past life. Re:Zero − Starting Life in Another World novelist Tappei Nagatsuki said that one of the strongest points of Mushoku Tensei was the handling of Rudeus who is noted to suffer similarly to the main character from the visual novel Clannad.

Response by Rifujin na Magonote
The original author Rifujin na Magonote noted that there were several negative comments about how perverted Rudeus was in the series. In response, he said that in the series' beginning, he is "100%" perverted when being reborn and "0%" regarding seriousness. As a result, when the narrative progresses in the series, Rudeus becomes a more serious character but without erasing his original self. However, the anime omitted such event from the original novel, which makes the protagonist more perverted in comparison. In retrospect, when Rudeus lusts for Roxy in the first chapters, the author commented Rudeus was still not used to his new life and asked fans to look forward to future episodes where the protagonist starts developing more. When the anime was released, Rifujin na Magonote was surprised by the amount of negative comments by viewers. Still, he believes he managed to give Rudeus a good balance when it comes to his characterization.

Notes

References

External links
  

Literary characters introduced in 2012
Fantasy anime and manga characters
Fictional polyamorous characters
Fictional Japanese people in anime and manga
Male characters in anime and manga
Teenage characters in anime and manga
Anime and manga characters who use magic